Shestakovo is a rural locality (a selo) and the administrative center of Shestakovskoye Rural Settlement, Bobrovsky District, Voronezh Oblast, Russia. The population was 1,112 as of 2010. There are 20 streets.

Geography 
Shestakovo is located 63 km south of Bobrov (the district's administrative centre) by road. Lipovka is the nearest rural locality.

References 

Rural localities in Bobrovsky District